Robert Piotrowicz (born 1973)  is a Polish sound artist, composer, and improviser.

He works within contemporary electroacoustic music field. Piotrowicz is an instrumentalist whose main tools are modular synthesizer and guitar. He's an experienced improviser, working with world's known artists. Composer, author of many solo projects (recordings, performances), interdisciplinary projects (scores for theatre plays, literary and radio projects) and abstract sound installations. He participated in many art events around the world.

Together with Anna Zaradny he runs Musica Genera label and annual festival of the same name.

Piotrowicz has developed his trademark sound of intense dynamics seized in dramatic and balanced form. Several albums with his solo music had been released, the last one so far, "Lasting Clinamen" in 2008, highly acclaimed by the critics around the globe.

Robert Piotrowicz as instrumentalist and composer works most often with Anna Zaradny also Burkhard Stangl, Valerio Tricoli. Other collaborators in recent years included Oren Ambarchi, Jerome Noetinger, Martin Klapper, Xavier Charles, Lasse Marhaug, John Hegre, Tony Buck, Kevin Drumm, and others.

Piotrowicz participated in many international events and festivals,
including: "In Between" Chicago 2001, Jazz in E. in Germany, Copenhagen Jazz Festiwal 2001, Audio Art Festival 2000/2004/2010, Muzyka z Mozgu 2000, Artgenda 2002, Horbar Festival Hamburg 2002, ALTF4, SKIFF, NPAI Pathenay, AuxPole'n, Densities 2005/2009, Ultra Hang 2007, Hapzura 2007 Club Transmediale 2008, Stimul 08, What Is Music 2009, All Ears 2010, Lausanne Underground Film and Music Festival 2010 and others.

The long list of interdisciplinary projects that Piotrowicz participated in include: "Zmartwychwstanie", "Homage", TOJTOJ, "Summe von Nullen", "Definition". He composed music for theatre plays: "Lastade" " Lasztownia 2008. Four pictures in Space, "Smierc czlowieka wiewiórki", "Bóg/ Honor/Ojczyzna: Katarzyna Medycejska".

poetry, literature projects
"Herbert: Reconstrukcja Poety" dir. M. Liber. Teatr usta usta/2xu. Warsaw 2008
"Hra na Ohradu"(dir. L. Jiricka, text . Stanislav Dvorský, Prague 2008)
"Pan Cogito"(Zbigniew Herbert, Bucuresti 2009, 2 cd audiobook)
"RANCIO" (dir. L. Jiricka text. Emil Cioran, Prague 2010, radio play)

discography
Robert Piotrowicz - Rurokura meets Jelito mini cdr (polycephal)
Robert Piotrowicz / Burkhard Stangl / Anna Zaradny - Can't Illumination cd (musica genera)
Robert Piotrowicz - The Path To The Death cdr (phase!)
Robert Piotrowicz - Rurokura and Final Warn cd (emd.pl/records)
Robert Piotrowicz / Xavier Charles - /// cd (emd.pl/records)
Robert Piotrowicz - Lasting Clinamen cd (musica genera)
Robert Piotrowicz – Rurokura and Eastern European Folk Music Research vol.2 7" (bocianrecords)
Robert Piotrowicz / Carl Michael von Hausswolff – split LP (bocianrecords)
Kevin Drumm / Jerome Noetinger / Robert Piotrowicz – Wrestling 7" (bocianrecords)
Robert Piotrowicz / C. Spencer Yeh – AMBIENT – onde sided LP (bocianrecords)
Robert Piotrowicz - When Snakeboy Is Dying - LP (musica genera)
Robert Piotrowicz - Lincoln Sea - LP (musica genera)

External links
web site of Robert Piotrowicz
Musica Genera
article about Robert Piotrowicz on Playground
interview in English on Biweekly

1973 births
Experimental composers
Free improvisation
Electroacoustic improvisation
Living people
Male classical composers
20th-century male musicians